Armaueriidae is a family of worms belonging to the order Polystilifera.

Genera

Genera:
 Armaueria Brinkmann, 1917
 Mesarmaueria Korotkevich, 1955
 Neoarmaueria Chernyshev, 1992

References

Polystilifera
Nemertea families